Ixapion variegatum (Wencker, 1864), the Kiss Me Slow Weevil, is a weevil in the family Brentidae, which occurs at low densities throughout its west European range.

Its larval stages feed on Mistletoe, from which its English vernacular name is derived. Eggs are laid in the plants stems, just below terminal buds. In Europe, the larvae feed from April–July, and emerge the following June.

Feeding by adult weevils, which are between 2.1 and 2.8 mm long, results in brown speckling on the plant's leaves.

References 

Parasites of plants
Beetles described in 1864
Brentidae